Yaniuska Isabel Espinosa (born 5 December 1986) is a Venezuelan weightlifter who competes in the +75 kg division. She won gold medals at the 2014 Pan American Championships and 2015 Pan American Games, and placed seventh at the 2016 Olympics.

Espinosa took up weightlifting aged 13 in Puerto Cabello. She is married to Juan Jose Camacaro and has three sons, Luis Alberto (b. 2007), Luis Eduardo (b. 2007) and Omar Jesus (b. 2008).

She won the silver medal in her event at the 2022 South American Games held in Asunción, Paraguay.

References

External links

 
 
 

1986 births
Living people
Venezuelan female weightlifters
Olympic weightlifters of Venezuela
Weightlifters at the 2016 Summer Olympics
Place of birth missing (living people)
Pan American Games medalists in weightlifting
Pan American Games gold medalists for Venezuela
Weightlifters at the 2015 Pan American Games
South American Games silver medalists for Venezuela
South American Games gold medalists for Venezuela
South American Games medalists in weightlifting
Competitors at the 2010 South American Games
Competitors at the 2018 South American Games
Competitors at the 2022 South American Games
Medalists at the 2015 Pan American Games
Medalists at the 2011 Pan American Games
Pan American Weightlifting Championships medalists
21st-century Venezuelan women